Pawłowiczki (from 1936: Gnadenfeld) is a village in Kędzierzyn-Koźle County, Opole Voivodeship, in south-western Poland. It is the seat of the gmina (administrative district) called Gmina Pawłowiczki.

Founded by the Moravian Brethren in 1743, it was for a century the site of their theological seminary.

The village now has a population of 1,300.

Notable residents
 Walter Schulz (1912-2000), German philosopher

References 

Villages in Kędzierzyn-Koźle County
Settlements of the Moravian Church